The 2020 Valour FC season was the second season in the club's history, as well as the second season in Canadian Premier League history.

Current squad
As of August 12, 2020.

Transfers

In

Transferred in

Loans In

Draft picks 
Valour FC selected the following players in the 2019 CPL–U Sports Draft on November 11, 2019. Draft picks are not automatically signed to the team roster. Only those who are signed to a contract will be listed as transfers in.

Out

Transferred out

Canadian Premier League

Match times are Central Daylight Time (UTC−5).

First stage

Table

Results by match

Matches

Statistics

Squad and statistics 

|-

  

 
 

 
 
 
 
 
 
 
 
 
 
 
 
 
 
 
|-
|}

Top scorers 
{| class="wikitable sortable alternance"  style="font-size:85%; text-align:center; line-height:14px; width:85%;"
|-
!width=10|Rank
!width=10|Nat.
! scope="col" style="width:275px;"|Player
!width=10|Pos.
!width=80|Canadian Premier League
!width=80|TOTAL
|-
|rowspan=8|1|||| Fraser Aird        || MF || 1 ||1
|-
||| Dylan Carreiro         || MF || 1 ||1
|-
||| Andrew Jean-Baptiste         || DF || 1 ||1
|-
||| José Galán         || MF || 1 ||1
|-
||| Masta Kacher         || FW || 1 ||1
|-
||| Moses Dyer         || MF || 1 ||1
|-
||| Daryl Fordyce         || FW || 1 ||1
|-
||| Yohan Le Bourhis         || DF || 1 ||1
|- class="sortbottom"
| colspan="4"|Totals||8||8

Top assists 
{| class="wikitable sortable alternance"  style="font-size:85%; text-align:center; line-height:14px; width:85%;"
|-
!width=10|Rank
!width=10|Nat.
! scope="col" style="width:275px;"|Player
!width=10|Pos.
!width=80|Canadian Premier League
!width=80|TOTAL
|-
|rowspan=2|1|||| Shaan Hundal || FW || 2 ||2
|-
||| Brett Levis || MF || 2 ||2
|-
|rowspan=1|3|||| José Galán || MF || 1 ||1
|- class="sortbottom"
| colspan="4"|Totals||5||5

Clean sheets 
{| class="wikitable sortable alternance"  style="font-size:85%; text-align:center; line-height:14px; width:85%;"
|-
!width=10|Rank
!width=10|Nat.
! scope="col" style="width:275px;"|Player
!width=80|Canadian Premier League
!width=80|TOTAL
|-
| 1|||| James Pantemis         || 2 ||2
|-
|- class="sortbottom"
| colspan="3"|Totals||2||2

Disciplinary record 
{| class="wikitable sortable alternance"  style="font-size:85%; text-align:center; line-height:14px; width:85%;"
|-
!rowspan="2" width=10|No.
!rowspan="2" width=10|Pos.
!rowspan="2" width=10|Nat.
!rowspan="2" scope="col" style="width:275px;"|Player
!colspan="2" width=80|Canadian Premier League
!colspan="2" width=80|TOTAL
|-
! !!  !!  !! 
|-
|7||FW|||| Masta Kacher    ||1||0||1||0
|-
|8||MF|||| Diego Gutiérrez    ||1||0||1||0
|-
|9||FW|||| Austin Ricci    ||3||0||3||0
|-
|10||FW|||| Dylan Carreiro    ||1||0||1||0
|-
|11||FW|||| Shaan Hundal ||1||0||1||0
|-
|14||DF|||| Stefan Cebara ||1||0||1||0
|-
|17||MF|||| Brett Levis ||1||0||1||0
|-
|21||MF|||| José Galán ||2||0||2||0
|-
|27||MF|||| Raphael Ohin ||1||0||1||0
|-
|33||MF|||| Fraser Aird    ||3||0||3||0
|-
|48||MF|||| Dante Campbell    ||1||0||1||0
|-
|- class="sortbottom"
| colspan="4"|Totals||16||0||16||0

Notes

References

External links 
Official site

2020
2020 Canadian Premier League
Canadian soccer clubs 2020 season
2020 in Manitoba